Rafael Ávalos Rivas (November 22, 1925 – April 15, 1993) was a Mexican football midfielder who played for Mexico national team in the 1954 FIFA World Cup. He also played for Atlante.

References

External links
FIFA profile

Mexican footballers
Mexico international footballers
Association football midfielders
Atlante F.C. footballers
Liga MX players
1954 FIFA World Cup players
1925 births
1993 deaths